North Northamptonshire was a county constituency in Northamptonshire, represented in  the House of Commons of the Parliament of the United Kingdom.

Boundaries 
1832–1885: The Liberty of Peterborough, and the Hundreds of Willybrook, Polebrook, Huxloe, Navisford, Corby, Higham Ferrers, Rothwell, Hamfordshoe and Orlingbury.

1885–1918: The Sessional Divisions of Oundle and Thrapstone, part of the Sessional Division of Kettering, the Liberty of the Soke of Peterborough, and the part of the Municipal Borough of Stamford in the county of Northamptonshire.

The constituency was created by the Great Reform Act for the 1832 general election, and abolished for the 1918 general election, when it was merged into Peterborough.

Members of Parliament 
From 1832 until 1885, the constituency returned two Members of Parliament elected by the bloc vote system. Under the Redistribution of Seats Act 1885, with effect from the 1885 general election, its area was reduced and representation reduced to one member, elected by the first past the post voting system.

1832 - 1885

1885 - 1918

Election results

Elections in the 1830s

Wentworth-Fitzwilliam succeeded to the peerage, becoming 5th Earl Fitzwilliam and causing a by-election.

Wentworth-Fitzwilliam's death caused a by-election.

Elections in the 1840s

Elections in the 1850s

 
 

 
 

Stafford's death caused a by-election.

 

 
{{Election box winning candidate with party link|
 |party = Conservative Party (UK)
 |candidate = George Ward Hunt
 |votes = 1,831
 |percentage = 36.4
 |change = N/A''
}}  

Elections in the 1860s

 

Cecil was appointed Treasurer of the Household, requiring a by-election.

Cecil succeeded to the peerage, becoming 3rd Marquess of Exeter, causing a by-election.

Hunt was appointed Chancellor of the Exchequer, requiring a by-election.

 

 

Elections in the 1870s

 

Hunt was appointed First Lord of the Admiralty, causing a by-election.

 

Hunt's death caused a by-election.

 

 

 Elections in the 1880s 

 

Cecil was appointed Groom in Waiting, requiring a by-election.

 Elections in the 1890s 

 Elections in the 1900s 

 Elections in the 1910s General Election 1914–15:

Another General Election was required to take place before the end of 1915. The political parties had been making preparations for an election to take place and by the July 1914, the following candidates had been selected; Unionist: Henry BrasseyLiberal''':

References

See also 
Peterborough (UK Parliament constituency)

Parliamentary constituencies in Northamptonshire (historic)
Constituencies of the Parliament of the United Kingdom established in 1832
Constituencies of the Parliament of the United Kingdom disestablished in 1918